Maycon Vinicius Ferreira da Cruz (born 29 July 1992), commonly known as Nikão, is a Brazilian professional footballer who plays as an attacking midfielder for Cruzeiro, on loan from São Paulo.

Personal life
Born in Montes Claros, Minas Gerais, Nikão did not know his father and lost his mother due to a cancer at the age of nine. He was raised by his grandmother, and after impressing in a local amateur team at the age of 12, he was brought up to Mirassol, São Paulo for a trial period. At the age of 16, he also lost his grandmother, and two years later, his brother Thiago also died.

Club career

Early career
Nikão began his career with Mirassol's youth setup, and subsequently had trials at CSKA Moscow and PSV Eindhoven; despite impressing, he was unable to stay at those clubs after not having a legal representative in those countries. In 2009, after a brief period at Palmeiras, he moved to Santos.

Atlético Mineiro
On 16 April 2010, as Santos did not exercise the buyout clause on his loan contract, Nikão sigend for Atlético Mineiro. He made his Série A debut on 10 October, coming on as a second-half substitute for Renan Oliveira in a 0–1 away loss against Internacional.

After appearing rarely, Nikão was loaned to Série B side Vitória on 9 February 2011. He scored nine goals in only 12 appearances in the 2011 Campeonato Baiano, as his side lost the title to Bahia de Feira.

On 25 May 2011, Nikão moved to Bahia in the top tier, on loan until December. He subsequently served another loan deals at Ponte Preta, América Mineiro, Linense and Ceará.

Athletico Paranaense
On 14 January 2015 Nikão signed a three-year deal with Atlético Paranaense. He made his club debut on 26 February by playing the last 20 minutes of a 0–1 Campeonato Paranaense home loss against Foz do Iguaçu, and scored his first goal on 2 May by netting the third of 5–0 home routing of Nacional-PR.

On 6 June 2017, Nikão played his 100th match for Furacão. On 14 July 2019, he reached his 200th match.

On 10 October 2021, Nikão completed 300 matches for Athletico.

Career statistics

Honours
Atlético Mineiro
Campeonato Mineiro: 2010

Ceará
Copa do Nordeste: 2015

Athletico Paranaense
Campeonato Paranaense: 2016, 2020
Copa Sudamericana: 2018, 2021
J.League Cup / Copa Sudamericana Championship: 2019
Copa do Brasil: 2019

References

External links

1992 births
Living people
People from Montes Claros
Brazilian footballers
Association football midfielders
Campeonato Brasileiro Série A players
Campeonato Brasileiro Série B players
Clube Atlético Mineiro players
Esporte Clube Vitória players
Esporte Clube Bahia players
Associação Atlética Ponte Preta players
América Futebol Clube (MG) players
Clube Atlético Linense players
Ceará Sporting Club players
Club Athletico Paranaense players
São Paulo FC players
Cruzeiro Esporte Clube players
Sportspeople from Minas Gerais